Gilardi is an Italian surname. Notable people with the surname include:

Alessandro Gilardi (born 1995), Italian football player
Domenico Gilardi (1785–1845), Italian architect
Enrico Gilardi (born 1957), Italian basketball player
Fabrizio Gilardi (born 1975), Swiss political scientist
Gianpietro Gilardi (born 1938), Italian rower
Gilardo Gilardi (1889–1963), Argentine composer, pianist and conductor
Juan Ignacio Gilardi (born 1981). Argentine retired field hockey player 
Luigi Gilardi (1897–1989), Italian cyclist
Mauro Gilardi (born 1982), Italian footballer
Mauro Gilardi (born 1982), Italian footballer
Pier Celestino Gilardi (1837–1905), Italian painter
Piero Gilardi (born 1942), Italian artist
Thierry Gilardi (1958–2008), French football commentator

See also 

 Ghilardi
 Ghirardi

Italian-language surnames